Ochagavia carnea, the Tresco rhodostachys, is a plant species in the genus Ochagavia. This species is endemic to Chile.

References

Chilean Bromeliaceae: diversity, distribution and evaluation of conservation status (Published online: 10 March 2009)

Endemic flora of Chile
carnea